Yoo-suk, also spelled Yoo-seok or Yu-seok, is a Korean masculine given name. Its meaning depends on the hanja used to write each syllable of the name. There are 43 hanja with the reading "yoo" and 13 hanja with the reading "suk" on the South Korean government's official list of hanja which may be used in given names.

People with this name include:
Chung Yoo-suk (born 1977), South Korean footballer
Kim Yoo-suk (born 1982), South Korean pole vaulter
Kim Yu-seok (born 1966), South Korean actor

See also
List of Korean given names

References

Korean masculine given names